Vír is a municipality and village in Žďár nad Sázavou District in the Vysočina Region of the Czech Republic. It has about 700 inhabitants. It lies on the Svratka River.

References

Villages in Žďár nad Sázavou District